Nepenthes reinwardtiana  is a tropical pitcher plant native to Borneo and Sumatra and to a number of smaller surrounding islands including Bangka, Natuna, Nias, and Siberut. Although some sources have included Peninsular Malaysia and Singapore within the range of this species, these records appear to be erroneous.

Nepenthes reinwardtiana has an unusually wide altitudinal distribution of 0–2200 m, being both a "lowland" and "highland" plant.  There are many different colour forms, ranging from green to dark red.  This species is known for the two "eye spots" on the inside surface of its pitchers.

The specific epithet reinwardtiana honours Caspar Georg Carl Reinwardt. The species has been given the vernacular name Reinwardt's pitcher-plant.

Taxonomy and systematics

Nepenthes naquiyuddinii
Nepenthes naquiyuddinii  was described in 2006 by J. H. Adam and Hafiza A. Hamid. The taxon is only known from Keningau-Kimanis Road and the foot of Mount Trus Madi, both in Sabah, Borneo, where it grows at an elevation of 1400 to 1424 m in open secondary vegetation.

Although acknowledging close affinities between N. naquiyuddinii and N. reinwardtiana, Adam and Hafiza stated that the "two species exhibit many morphological differences and therefore they cannot be united into the same species".  However, some authors consider these differences too small for species status and treat N. naquiyuddinii as a heterotypic synonym of N. reinwardtiana. Alternatively, N. naquiyuddinii may represent a natural hybrid involving N. fusca and N. reinwardtiana, the only species that are sympatric with it.

Phylogeny

In 2001, Charles Clarke performed a cladistic analysis of the Nepenthes species of Sumatra and Peninsular Malaysia using 70 morphological characteristics of each taxon. The following is a portion of the resultant cladogram, showing part of "Clade 6", which includes N. reinwardtiana.

Intraspecific taxa

Nepenthes reinwardtiana var. samarindaensis J.H.Adam & Wilcock (1993)

Natural hybrids

The following natural hybrids involving N. reinwardtiana have been recorded.

N. albomarginata × N. reinwardtiana [=N. × ferrugineomarginata]
N. ampullaria × N. reinwardtiana
N. clipeata × N. reinwardtiana
N. fusca × N. reinwardtiana [=?N. naquiyuddinii]
N. gracilis × N. reinwardtiana
N. gymnamphora × N. reinwardtiana
N. hispida × N. reinwardtiana
N. macrovulgaris × N. reinwardtiana
N. mirabilis × N. reinwardtiana
N. reinwardtiana × N. spathulata
N. reinwardtiana × N. stenophylla
N. reinwardtiana × N. tentaculata [=?N. murudensis]
N. reinwardtiana × N. tobaica

Notes

a.The species was named after the Universiti Kebangsaan Malaysia Pro-Chancellor, Yang Amat Mulia Tunku Laxamana Tunku Dato' Seri Utama Naquiyuddin Ibni Tuanku Ja'afar.

References

Further reading

 Adam, J.H. 1997.  Pertanika Journal of Tropical Agricultural Science 20(2–3): 121–134.
 Adam, J.H. & C.C. Wilcock 1999.  Pertanika Journal of Tropical Agricultural Science 22(1): 1–7.
  Akhriadi, P. 2007. Kajian taksonomi hibrid alami Nepenthes (Nepenthaceae) di Kerinci. Working paper, Andalas University, Padang. Abstract 
 Bauer, U., C.J. Clemente, T. Renner & W. Federle 2012. Form follows function: morphological diversification and alternative trapping strategies in carnivorous Nepenthes pitcher plants. Journal of Evolutionary Biology 25(1): 90–102. 
 Beaman, J.H. & C. Anderson 2004. The Plants of Mount Kinabalu: 5. Dicotyledon Families Magnoliaceae to Winteraceae. Natural History Publications (Borneo), Kota Kinabalu.
 Bourke, G. 2010.  Captive Exotics Newsletter 1(1): 4–7. 
 Bourke, G. 2011. The Nepenthes of Mulu National Park. Carniflora Australis 8(1): 20–31.
 Chung, A.Y.C. 2006. Biodiversity and Conservation of The Meliau Range: A Rain Forest in Sabah's Ultramafic Belt. Natural History Publications (Borneo), Kota Kinabalu. .
  Deswita, E. 2010. Perkembangan ginesium beberapa jenis Nepenthes (N. ampullaria Jack., N. gracilis Korth. dan N. reinwardtiana Miq.). Thesis, Andalas University, Padang. Abstract 
 Fretwell, S. 2013. Back in Borneo for giant Nepenthes. Part 1: Mesilau Nature Reserve, Ranau. Victorian Carnivorous Plant Society Journal 107: 6–13.
 Fretwell, S. 2013. Back in Borneo to see giant Nepenthes. Part 3: Mt. Trusmadi and Mt. Alab. Victorian Carnivorous Plant Society Journal 109: 6–15.
  Handayani, T. 1999.  [Conservation of Nepenthes in Indonesian botanic gardens.] In: A. Mardiastuti, I. Sudirman, K.G. Wiryawan, L.I. Sudirman, M.P. Tampubolon, R. Megia & Y. Lestari (eds.) Prosiding II: Seminar Hasil-Hasil Penelitian Bidang Ilmu Hayat. Pusat Antar Universitas Ilmu Hayat IPB, Bogor. pp. 365–372.
  Hartini, S. 2007. Keragaman flora dari Monumen Alam Kersik Luway, Kalimantan Timur. [Flora diversity from Kersik Luway Nature Monument, East Kalimantan.] Biodiversitas 8(1): 67–72. 
 Hernawati & P. Akhriadi 2006. A Field Guide to the Nepenthes of Sumatra. PILI-NGO Movement, Bogor.
 Kato, M., M. Hotta, R. Tamin & T. Itino 1993. Inter- and intra-specific variation in prey assemblages and inhabitant communities in Nepenthes pitchers in Sumatra. Tropical Zoology 6(1): 11–25. Abstract
 Lee, C.C. 2000. Recent Nepenthes Discoveries. [video] The 3rd Conference of the International Carnivorous Plant Society, San Francisco, USA.
 Lee, C.C. 2002.  Proceedings of the 4th International Carnivorous Plant Conference, Hiroshima University, Tokyo: 25–30.
 Macfarlane, J.M. 1914. Family XCVI. Nepenthaceæ. [pp. 279–288] In: J.S. Gamble. Materials for a flora of the Malayan Peninsula, No. 24. Journal & Proceedings of the Asiatic Society of Bengal 75(3): 279–391.
  Mansur, M. 2001.  In: Prosiding Seminar Hari Cinta Puspa dan Satwa Nasional. Lembaga Ilmu Pengetahuan Indonesia, Bogor. pp. 244–253.
  Mansur, M. 2007. Keanekaragaman jenis Nepenthes (kantong semar) dataran rendah di Kalimantan Tengah. [Diversity of lowland Nepenthes (kantong semar) in Central Kalimantan.] Berita Biologi 8(5): 335–341. Abstract
 Mansur, M. & F.Q. Brearley 2008. Ecological studies on Nepenthes at Barito Ulu, Central Kalimantan, Indonesia. Jurnal Teknologi Lingkungan 9(3): 271–276.
 McPherson, S.R. & A. Robinson 2012. Field Guide to the Pitcher Plants of Borneo. Redfern Natural History Productions, Poole.
 McPherson, S.R. & A. Robinson 2012. Field Guide to the Pitcher Plants of Sumatra and Java. Redfern Natural History Productions, Poole.
 Meimberg, H., A. Wistuba, P. Dittrich & G. Heubl 2001. Molecular phylogeny of Nepenthaceae based on cladistic analysis of plastid trnK intron sequence data. Plant Biology 3(2): 164–175. 
  Meimberg, H. 2002.  Ph.D. thesis, Ludwig Maximilian University of Munich, Munich.
 Meimberg, H. & G. Heubl 2006. Introduction of a nuclear marker for phylogenetic analysis of Nepenthaceae. Plant Biology 8(6): 831–840. 
 Meimberg, H., S. Thalhammer, A. Brachmann & G. Heubl 2006. Comparative analysis of a translocated copy of the trnK intron in carnivorous family Nepenthaceae. Molecular Phylogenetics and Evolution 39(2): 478–490. 
  Meriko, L. 2010. Perkembangan androesium beberapa jenis Nepenthes (N. ampullaria Jack., N. gracilis Korth. dan N. reinwardtiana Miq.). M.Sc. thesis, Andalas University, Padang. Abstract 
  Oikawa, T. 1992. Nepenthes reinwardtiana Miq.. In: . [The Grief Vanishing.] Parco Co., Japan. pp. 40–41.
 Renner, T. & C.D. Specht 2011. A sticky situation: assessing adaptations for plant carnivory in the Caryophyllales by means of stochastic character mapping. International Journal of Plant Sciences 172(7): 889–901. 
  Rosyida, U. & S. Hut 2010. Keberadaan Nepenthes di cagar alam Padang Luway. Balai Konservasi Sumber Daya Alam Kalimantan Timur.
  Syamsuardi & R. Tamin 1994. Kajian kekerabatan jenis-jenis Nepenthes di Sumatera Barat. Project report, Andalas University, Padang. Abstract 
  Syamsuardi 1995. Klasifikasi numerik kantong semar (Nepenthes) di Sumatera Barat. [Numerical classification of pitcher plants (Nepenthes) in West Sumatra.] Journal Matematika dan Pengetahuan Alam 4(1): 48–57. Abstract 
  Syamswisna 2009. Analisis vegetasi pada habitat kantong semar (Nepenthes reinwardtiana Miq.) di Paninjauan, Kabupaten Solok. M.Sc. thesis, Andalas University, Padang. Abstract 
  Syamswisna 2010. Studi habitat kantong semar (Nepenthes reinwardtiana Miq.) di Paninjauan, Kabupaten Solok. Jurnal Guru Membangun 24(2): [unpaginated; 10 pp.] Abstract 
 Thong, J. 2006.  Victorian Carnivorous Plant Society Journal 81: 12–17.
 Thorogood, C. 2010. The Malaysian Nepenthes: Evolutionary and Taxonomic Perspectives. Nova Science Publishers, New York.
  Yogiara 2004.  M.Sc. thesis, Bogor Agricultural University, Bogor.
 Yogiara, A. Suwanto & M.T. Suhartono 2006. A complex bacterial community living in pitcher plant fluid. Jurnal Mikrobiologi Indonesia 11(1): 9–14.
  Yusmad, R. 2008. Stuktur anatomi daun dan sulur serta perkembangan kantung pada kantung semar (Nepenthes reinwardtana Miq). M.Sc. thesis, Andalas University, Padang. Abstract 

Carnivorous plants of Asia
reinwardtiana
Flora of Borneo
Flora of Sumatra
Plants described in 1852
Taxa named by Friedrich Anton Wilhelm Miquel